Escape to Paradise is a 1939 American film directed by Erle C. Kenton.

Plot
Jaded playboy Richard Fleming travels to the South American nation of Rosarita.  Through his motorcycle riding guide Roberto he discovers true love and a career as a Yerba mate exporter.

Cast
Bobby Breen as Roberto Ramos
Kent Taylor as Richard Fleming
Marla Shelton as Juanita
Rudolph Anders as Alexander Komac
Joyce Compton as Penelope Carter
Pedro de Cordoba as Don Miguel
Rosina Galli as Brigida, the Dueña
Anna Demetrio as Señora Ramos, Roberto's Mother
Francisco Marán as Perez
Carlos Villarías as Gonzales
 Frank Yaconelli as Manuel, the Taxi Driver

Soundtrack
 "Tra-La-La" (Music by Nilo Menendez, lyrics by Eddie Cherkose)
 "Rhythm of the Rio" (Music by Nilo Menendez. Lyrics by Eddie Cherkose)

External links

1939 films
American black-and-white films
1939 musical comedy films
1939 romantic comedy films
RKO Pictures films
Films set in South America
American romantic musical films
American musical comedy films
1930s romantic musical films
Films directed by Erle C. Kenton
1930s English-language films
1930s American films